Liu Xiaoqian is a Chinese journalist, known for his reporting stories on crime in Brazil, revolutionary guerillas in Colombia and race riots in America.

Early life 
He was born in Jinjiang, Fujian province in 1988. He studied in Jinjiang and majored in Portuguese in Communication University of China, graduating in 2010.

Career 
In 2010 he joined CCTV. Since 2011, he has acted as the reporter for CCTV's Latin America center. Liu reported on the countdown to the Rio Olympics, slum tourism and Amazon rainforest protection. In April 2013, Liu participated in the large-scale report "exploring the amazon tide". In June 2013, one year before the opening anniversary of the football World Cup in Brazil, Liu broadcast an investigative report "Brazil at gunpoint".

In 2019 he relocated to America and began a series of reports on the nation including coverage of the protests related to race during the spring and summer of 2020.

Personal life
He currently resides in Chicago.

References

 腾讯南非世界杯前方报道团队记者：刘骁骞  ．Tencent. May 12, 2010 Dec 5 2018
 专访阿根廷足球教父：梅西与四年前判若两人  ． Tencent. June 22, 2010 Dec 5 2018
 腾讯记者接受外媒采访 特别球衣引注目  ．Tencent. June 8, 2010 Dec 5 2018
 央视搜索-枪口上的巴西  ．CCTV network. Dec 5 2018
 我校级葡语毕业生、央视记者刘骁骞深入巴西“毒窝”采访获好评  ．Communication university of China. 2014-05-07 Dec 5 2018
 央视记者淡定采访巴西毒贩 网友赞比战地记者牛  ．Tencent May 6, 2014 Dec 5 2018
 《面对面：刘骁骞-走进“上帝之城”》  ．CCTV network. 2014-05-11 Dec 5 2018

1988 births
Chinese journalists
CCTV newsreaders and journalists
People from Jinjiang, Fujian
Communication University of China alumni
Living people